Macropharyngodon meleagris, the black-spotted wrasse, Eastern leopard wrasse or reticulated wrasse,  is a species of ray-finned fish from the family Labridae, the wrasses. This species is native to the eastern Indian Ocean and the Pacific Ocean. This species can reach a length of  SL. It can also be found in the aquarium trade. Juveniles display different color patterns than adults with dominating light colors and eyespots blending in with soft coral habitats and potentially avoiding predation.

References

External links
 

meleagris
Fish described in 1839
Taxa named by Achille Valenciennes